The Earth Is a Sinful Song is a 1973 Finnish drama film directed by Rauni Mollberg and based on the novel Maa on syntinen laulu by late Finnish author Timo K. Mukka. It was entered into the 24th Berlin International Film Festival. The film was also selected as the Finnish entry for the Best Foreign Language Film at the 46th Academy Awards, but was not accepted as a nominee. It was the most successful film in Finland between 1972 and 1976.

Cast
 Maritta Viitamäki as Martta Mäkelä
 Pauli Jauhojärvi as Juhani Mäkelä
 Aimo Saukko as Old man Mäkelä
 Milja Hiltunen as Alli Mäkelä
 Sirkka Saarnio as Elina Pouta
 Niiles-Jouni Aikio as Oula
 Veikko Kotavuopio as Kurki-Pertti
 Jouko Hiltunen as Hannes
 Osmo Hettula as The preacher
 Maija-Liisa Ahlgren as Aino Liinukorpi
 Kauko Jauhojärvi as Antti Lanto
 Irja Uusisalmi as Anna Kurkela
 Eelis Tiensuu as Poudan isäntä
 Elsa Kellinsalmi as Poudan emäntä
 Toivo Lampela as Outakodan vanhaisäntä

See also
 List of submissions to the 46th Academy Awards for Best Foreign Language Film
 List of Finnish submissions for the Academy Award for Best Foreign Language Film

References

External links

1973 films
1973 drama films
Finnish drama films
1970s Finnish-language films
Films directed by Rauni Mollberg
Films based on Finnish novels
Laestadianism in popular culture